The Senegal women's national football team represents Senegal in international women's football. The team is governed by the Senegalese Football Federation.

History
Senegal has already had a women's team in the 1970s under the name Gazelles de Dakar. Some of these players have even been solicited by European clubs, such as European clubs, such as Ndew Niang, the first Senegalese to play in the first division of Ndew Niang is the first Senegalese player to play in the   Bundesliega in the team of Normonia 08.
After a promising start in the 1970s, Senegalese women's soccer has considerably lost ground to other African teams such as Nigeria, Ghana, Congo etc.
From 1974 to 2002, many Senegalese teams disappeared due to problems not yet identified.
In 2002, Senegal participated for the first time in a qualifying phase of the African Cup of Nations. This means that 28 years have passed without Senegal really taking into account women's soccer.

Home stadium

Results and fixtures

The following is a list of match results in the last 12 months, as well as any future matches that have been scheduled.

Legend

2022

2023

Source : global sport

Coaching staff

Managers

  Bassouare Diaby (−2021)
  Mame Moussa Cissé (2021–)

Players

Current squad
The following list is the final squad for 2023 FIFA Women's World Cup qualification  in February 2023   .
 Caps and goals accurate up to and including 28 February 2022.
 

}

}

}

(Players are listed within position group by kit number, order of caps, then alphabetically)

Recent call ups
The following players have been called up to a Senegal squad in the past 12 months.

}

}

PRE Preliminary squad

(Players are listed within position group by order of latest call-up, caps, and then alphabetically)

Previous squads
Africa Women Cup of Nations
2012 African Women's Championship squad
2022 Africa Women Cup of Nations squad
WAFU Zone A Women's Cup
2023 WAFU Zone A Women's Cup squads

Individual records
 Active players in bold, statistics correct as of 2020.

Most capped players

Top goalscorers

Competitive record
 Champions   Runners-up   Third place   Fourth place

FIFA Women's World Cup

*Draws include knockout matches decided on penalty kicks.

Olympic Games

*Draws include knockout matches decided on penalty kicks.

Africa Women Cup of Nations

African Games

WAFU Women's Cup record

Honours

Regional
WAFU Zone A Women's Cup
Champions (2):  2020 ,2023

All−time record against FIFA recognized nations
The list shown below shows the Djibouti national football team all−time international record against opposing nations.
*As of xxxxxx after match against  xxxx.
Key

Record per opponent
*As ofxxxxx after match against  xxxxx.
Key

The following table shows Djibouti's all-time official international record per opponent:

See also

 Sport in Senegal
 Football in Senegal
 Women's football in Senegal

References

External links
Official website
FIFA profile

African women's national association football teams
W